The 1984–85 New Jersey Devils season was the 11th season for the National Hockey League franchise that was established on June 11, 1974, and third season since the franchise relocated from Colorado prior to the 1982–83 NHL season. For the seventh consecutive season the team did not qualify for the playoffs.

Offseason
Lou Vairo joined the team as an assistant coach to Carpenter.

Regular season

Final standings

Schedule and results

Player statistics

Regular season
Scoring

Goaltending

Note: GP = Games played; G = Goals; A = Assists; Pts = Points; +/- = Plus/minus; PIM = Penalty minutes; PPG=Power-play goals; SHG=Short-handed goals; GWG=Game-winning goals
      MIN=Minutes played; W = Wins; L = Losses; T = Ties; GA = Goals against; GAA = Goals against average; SO = Shutouts;

Awards and records

Transactions

Draft picks
New Jersey's draft picks at the 1984 NHL Entry Draft held at the Montreal Forum in Montreal, Quebec.

Farm teams

See also
1984–85 NHL season

References

External links

New Jersey Devils seasons
New Jersey Devils
New Jersey Devils
New Jersey Devils
New Jersey Devils
20th century in East Rutherford, New Jersey
Meadowlands Sports Complex